Villa Karo is a Finnish-African culture center and artist residence in the coastal village of Grand-Popo, Benin. Its purpose is to build a bridge between Finnish and African artists and cultural figures. The primary task is to offer a possibility to reside in Africa for Finnish artists, researchers, teachers and other professionals in cultural and social fields. In addition, African professionals in culture are encouraged to visit Finland.

Periods for application into residence are twice in a year. The fall residencies applications are due in 15 March, and for the spring residencies applications are due in 15 September.

History 
When writer Juha Vakkuri travelled in the region in the 1990s, he conceived the idea of establishing a cultural center in Grand-Popo. He set up a non-profit organization to promote the idea. Vakkuri named the center Villa Karo in honour of his deceased son Karo.

The hearth of the center is a colonial, Afro-Brazilian style old hospital that was renovated into main building. It was opened in 2000. The site was selected because Grand-Popo, a tranquill fishing village offers good set for creating. Benin is one of the most stable and democratic countries in the continent.

Activity 
Villa Karo offers following free cultural services for local people and visitors.

Musée Karo 
A small museum was opened in 2001, where art and objects related to West African culture and Animist religion are displayed. The museum collection reflect both influences of European culture in Africa, understanding of Europeans of Africa and reflections of African culture in Europe.

A new museum Musée Karo was opened in 2015 in former bank of the village.

Community centre 
In 2003 a new multi-purpose space Lissa Gbassa was opened. It serves as a space for exhibitions, meetings, outside movie theater and a performance stage in monthly concerts and performances.

Library 
There is a public library in Villa Karo, which includes about 3,000 volumes of literature in Finnish, French, English and Swedish.

Artists residence 
For the scholars the center offers five rooms that are both living and working spaces. 

About 800 artists and cultural researchers have spent their time in the center. In addition, about 2,000 people from Finland, from university students to president Tarja Halonen have paid a visit to Villa Karo.

The center is financed by the Finnish Ministry of Education and Culture, private sponsors and donors. Villa Karo has advocacy members, such as Aalto University, Sibelius Academy, Helsinki Theatre Academy, Åbo Akademi University, University of Turku, and Ornamo Art and Design Finland, The Society of Finnish Composers, Society of Swedish Authors in Finland and the Finnish Playwrights and Screenwriters Guild.

Photos

References

External links 
 Villa Karo homepage 
 Akasia News 

Arts organisations based in Benin
Benin–Finland relations
Mono Department
Artist residencies
Artist's retreats
Finnish artist groups and collectives
Museums in Benin